James J. Martin  (1916–2004) was an American historian and author known for espousing Holocaust denial in his works. He is known for his book, American Liberalism and World Politics, 1931–1941 (1964). Fellow Holocaust denier Harry Elmer Barnes called it "unquestionably the most formidable achievement of World War II Revisionism."

Education
 University of New Hampshire 1942
 University of Michigan Master's degree in 1945, doctorate in history in 1949

Teaching

After a teaching career at Northern Illinois University, San Francisco State College, and Deep Springs College, he took a job teaching at Robert LeFevre's Rampart College, assuming it would be a full-time job. This was not the case as Rampart College was not yet really a college but only a series of workshop/lectures on libertarian political economy. That led to an eventual falling out between Martin and LeFevre when Rampart College went out of business three years after Martin was hired, with Martin charging LeFevre with a breach of his five-year contract.

Holocaust denial
From 1979, Martin began to associate with the Institute for Historical Review (IHR), a Holocaust denial group, writing for the IHR journal, The Journal of Historical Review. Brian Doherty notes in Radicals for Capitalism: "Martin, in his attempt to adjust standard historical understandings of war and war guilt, shifted into questioning the veracity of standard anti-German atrocity stories, including the standard details of the Holocaust", calls it an "unfortunate shading over into Hitler apologetics", and that Martin stated as early as 1976 "I don't believe that the evidence of a planned extermination of the entire Jewish population of Europe is holding up."

Works

Books 
 Men Against the State: The Expositors of Individualist Anarchism in America, 1827–1908. Foreword by Harry Elmer Barnes. Dekalb, Ill.: Adrian Allen Associates (1953). Audiobook.
 Republished by Ralph Myles (1970), the Ludwig von Mises Institute (2009), and via CreateSpace (2010).
 American Liberalism and World Politics, 1931–1941: Liberalism's Press and Spokesmen on the Road Back to War Between Mukden and Pearl Harbor. (Volumes 1 and 2). Foreword by John Chamberlain. New York: Devin-Adair (1964).
 Revisionist Viewpoints: Essays in a Dissident Historical Tradition. Colorado Springs, Colo.: Ralph Myles (1971).
 Watershed of Empire: Essays on New Deal Foreign Policy, edited with Leonard Liggio. Colorado Springs, Colo.: Ralph Myles (1976).
 The Saga of Hog Island and Other Essays in Inconvenient History. Colorado Springs, Colo.: Ralph Myles (1977).
 Beyond Pearl Harbor: Essays on Some Historical Consequences of the Crisis in the Pacific in 1941. Little Current, ON: Plowshare Press (1981). .
 The Man Who Invented 'Genocide': The Public Career and Consequences of Raphael Lemkin. Torrance, Calif.: Institute for Historical Review (1984).
 An American Adventure in Bookburning: In the Style of 1918. Colorado Springs, Colo.: Ralph Myles (1988).

Book reviews 
 Review of National Suicide: Military Aid to the Soviet Union by Antony C. Sutton. Reason, vol. 11, no. 1 (Nov. 1976). Archived from the original.

Articles 
 "A Beginner's Manual for Apprentice Bookburners." Amateur Book Collector, vol. 5, no. 4 (Dec. 1954).

References

Further reading
 Doherty, Brian. "James J. Martin, RIP"(obituary). Reason, April 6, 2004. Archived from the original.
 Weber, Mark. "James J. Martin: The Passing of a Great Historian"(obituary). Institute for Historical Review, April 2004. Archived from the original.

External links
 James J. Martin at the Mises Institute
 James J. Martin at Union of Egoists

1916 births
2004 deaths
University of New Hampshire alumni
University of Michigan alumni
Northern Illinois University faculty
San Francisco State University faculty
20th-century American historians
American male non-fiction writers
American libertarians
Historians of anarchism
American Holocaust deniers
American anti-war activists
Activists from California
20th-century American male writers